The British Art Fair (formerly the 20/21 British Art Fair) is a London-based art fair presenting modern, post War and contemporary British art.

A number of galleries exhibit at the fair each year. In the past, the fair was held at the Royal College of Art in South Kensington, west London, in September each year. In 2012, the fair celebrated its 25th anniversary. Due to a loss of availability of the venue, it was cancelled in 2016, but in June 2017 it was held during at the Mall Galleries in St James's, central London. In 2018, the art fair moved to Saatchi Gallery at the Duke of York's HQ, which has become the fair's new home.

See also
 London Art Fair

References

External links
 

1987 establishments in England
Recurring events established in 1987
Art fairs
Arts in London
Annual events in London
September events
June events
Royal College of Art
British art